Khalilovo (Xälil) is a rural locality (a selo) and the administrative center of Khalilovsky Selsoviet, Abzelilovsky District, Bashkortostan, Russia. The population was 1,117 as of 2010. There are 15 streets.

Geography 
Khalilovo is located 36 km south of Askarovo (the district's administrative centre) by road. Ishbuldino is the nearest rural locality.

References 

Rural localities in Abzelilovsky District